Kimberly M. Hayashi (born January 27, 1986 in Honolulu, Hawaii, United States) is an American professional "New/Current School" Bicycle Motocross (BMX) racer whose prime competitive years are from 2000–Present. Her many nicknames include: "Lil Kim", "Shorty", "Midget", "Sushi Roll", "Kim Woo", Lil Sushi, et al. all references to her diminutive 4' 10", 128 lbs. stature. She is also known as "Krashin' Kim" for her penchant to crash in races. She crashed in her first lap in her very first professional race in 2002 colliding with another rider. Despite this she would become the National Bicycle League (NBL)'s five consecutive number one professional women's racer from 2002 to 2007, which caused her to pick up yet another descriptive nickname: "Tenacious K".

Racing career milestones

Note: Professional first are on the national level unless otherwise indicated.

Started Racing: 1998 at age 12 in Chandler, Arizona at the Chandler BMX track. Her brother introduced her to the sport.

Sanctioning Body: American Bicycle Association (ABA)

First race result:

First race bike: Gary Fisher

First win (local):

First sponsor:  1999 Gordy's Bike Shop.

First national win:

Turned Professional: November 2001 at age 15 immediately after the American Bicycle Association (ABA) Grand Nationals. Redline teammate  Bubba Harris also turns pro on this occasion.

First Professional* race result:

First Professional win:

First Junior Women race result:

First Junior Women win:

First Elite Women** race result:

First Elite Women win:

Retired: Still active. She had plans to retire after participating in the 2008 Beijing Summer Olympics but her Olympic bid was quashed when she failed to make it out of the qualifying rounds at the UCI World Championships in Taiyuan, China. Jill Kintner qualified as the United States sole female BMX Olympic participant. She intends to keep on racing with the 2012 Summer Olympics as her goal (See "Post BMX career" section).

Height & weight at height of her career (2002–Present): Ht: 4'10". Wt:128 lbs.

*In the ABA only one level of professional class. No equivalent of the NBL/UCI's Junior Women class exist. The NBL/UCI Junior Women division is a Pro/Am class. A professional 16-year-old in the ABA must race in UCI Junior Women because you must be 17 years old or older to race in Elite Women. The NBL does have a dedicated Women's Pro class separate from the UCI.
**The NBL/UCI Elite Women division is a Pro Am class. You must be 17 years old and older to race in the Elite class.

Career factory and major bike shop sponsors

Note: This listing only denotes the racer's primary sponsors. At any given time a racer could have numerous ever changing co-sponsors. Primary sponsorships can be verified by BMX press coverage and sponsor's advertisements at the time in question. When possible exact dates are used.

Amateur/Junior
Gordy's Bike Shop: 1999-Early 2000
Enigma Factory Team: -September 2000
Redline Bicycles: September 2000-December 31, 2008. Kim Hayashi would turn professional with this sponsor.

Professional/Elite
Redline Bicycles: October 2000-December 31, 2008. The 2008 ABA Grand National was the last race for Hayashi on Redline. Hayashi's contract with Redline Bicycles will end on December 31, 2008. On December 11, 2008, Redline sent a press release thanking Hayashi for her years of service. Excerpt:

Gordy's Bike Shop: Mid 2009–2010. Hayashi returns to her original sponsor as she mounts her comeback in professional women's BMX to position herself for the 2012 London Summer Olympics.
Speedline/Supercross BMX: 2010-Current - Kim was added as the second Elite Women on the Speedline / Supercross BMX team at the end of 2010. Gordy's Bikes is still a proud co-sponsor of Kim's

Career bicycle motocross titles

Note: Listed are District, State/Provincial/Department, Regional, National, and International titles in italics. Only sanctioning bodies that were active during the racer's career are listed. Depending on point totals of individual racers, winners of Grand Nationals do not necessarily win National titles. Series and one off Championships are also listed in block.

Amateur/Junior
National Bicycle League (NBL)
1999, 2000 Arizona State Girls Champion.
American Bicycle Association (ABA)
2001 15 Girls World Cup Champion
2001 15 Girls Race of Champions (RoC) Champion.
2001 14-16 Cruiser Grandnational Champion
2000 & 2001 National Amateur Girl's Cruiser No.1
Union Cycliste Internationale (UCI)*
2002 18 & Under Women Cruiser Challenge World Champion*

*Even though she was a professional racer in the ABA by the time the 2002 UCI World Championships were held on July 27–29, she was still only 16 years old at that time and per UCI rules had to race in the youth and/or amateur division of the cruiser classes as part of the Challenge Championships, the championship races for those 16 years and younger that were held the day before the Adult and/or Professional classes in the UCI World Championships.

Professional/Elite
National Bicycle League (NBL)
2003 Girls Pro Grandnational Champion
2004 Elite Women and 14 & Over Girls Open Grandnational Champion (Doubled)
2003, '04, '05, '06, '07 Elite Women National No.1
American Bicycle Association (ABA)
2006 Pro Girls Grandnational Champion
Union Cycliste Internationale (UCI)*
2004 Junior Women's Pro World Champion

USA Cycling BMX:

Independent Pro Series Championships and Invitational Races
2006 RM59 Tropical BMX Challenge Pro Women Champion.

The Robbie Miranda 59 (RM59) Tropical BMX Challenge is an Invitational BMX exhibition race created and promoted by professional BMX racer Robbie Miranda (whose father is Puerto Rican) in Barceloneta, Puerto Rico. It is sanctioned by the Puerto Rican BMX Association (PRBMXA) for the local amateur racers who come out to race and see the BMX stars they only see in the BMX Press since no nationals are held by any major sanctioning body in Puerto Rico.

Notable accolades

Significant injuries
Broke her arm in early 2008.

Racing traits and habits
Tended to crash, earning the moniker "Krashin' Kim". She had a four-year annual first main crash streak during the ABA Grand Nationals until the 2006 edition in which she not only didn't crash in the first main, but was the Grand National winner. She achieved this it is said because she was all but mathematically out of contention for the No.1 Pro Girl title (she didn't win the title despite winning the event).

Post BMX career
She had plans on retiring after the 2008 Beijing Olympics if she had made it on to the US Olympic BMX team. She had plans to focus on Dental School and become an orthodontist from then on. However her Olympic bid ended when she failed to make it out of the qualifying rounds at the UCI World Championships in Taiyuan, China. Jill Kintner qualified as the United States sole female BMX Olympic participant. She finished out the 2008 season but suffering from injuries sustained in crashes. On December 3, 2008 she had surgery on an injured shoulder incurred in a crash. However, she fully intends to keep racing after recovering from her surgery and rehabilitation. She also intends to compete in the 2012 Summer Olympics in London, England. As she said in a December 29, 2008 post in Vintagebmx.com under her screen name of Redlinegirlkh:

BMX press magazine interviews and articles
"Factory Redline Pros" Transworld BMX November 2004 Vol.11 Iss.11 No.97. It is page 17 of the imbedded Redline catalog included in the magazine along with interviews of teammates Bubba Harris and Jason Carne$.
"Ruff Rider Kim "Lil' Kim" Hayashi-BMX" Vibe Magazine August 2008 Vol.16 No.7 Photo of Hayashi with a brief article of her preferences in Hip-Hop music.

BMX magazine covers

Note: Only magazines that were in publication at the time of the racer's career(s) are listed unless specifically noted.

BMX Plus!:

Snap BMX Magazine & Transworld BMX:

Moto Mag:
July/August 2003 Vol.2 No.3 (5) ahead of three unidentifieds. At bottom stylized photo of racer Dale Holmes.
BMX World:

Bicycles Today & BMX Today (The NBL official membership publication under two names):
BMX Today October 2007 in lower right hand corner.
ABA Action, American BMXer, BMXer (The ABA official membership publication under three names):

Notes

External links
 The American Bicycle Association (ABA) Website.
 The National Bicycle League (NBL) Website.
 2008 bmxmania.com interview with Kim Hayashi focusing on her upcoming Olympic competition.
 September 2007 Video interview of Hayashi conducted by Alise Post.
 BMXstars.com profile of Kim Hayashi.
 Brief August 30, 2005 autobiographical profile of herself (Google Cache).
 Martijn Scherpen.com interview of Kim Hayashi.
 Hayashi's UCI Rider details of NBL and UCI race results between March 30, 2002 & July 30, 2005.
 sarawalker95.com 2006 interview

American female cyclists
BMX riders
1986 births
Living people
21st-century American women